Hoplocorypha distinguenda is a species of praying mantis found in Nigeria.

See also
List of mantis genera and species

References

Hoplocorypha
Mantodea of Africa
Insects described in 1930